Amity High School is a public high school in Amity, Oregon, United States.

Academics
In 2008, 86% of the school's seniors received a high school diploma. Of 66 students, 57 graduated, seven dropped out, and two received a modified diploma.

Community
Since 1995, the high school has put on an annual spring community event called The Daffodil Festival to let students get the first-hand experience in hospitality and tourism.

References

External links
 Amity High School

High schools in Yamhill County, Oregon
Public high schools in Oregon